Egg Lake may refer to:

 Egg Lake (Nova Scotia, Canada)
 Egg Lake (Whatcom County, Washington), in North Cascades National Park, WA, USA